Aytech Qanoqo (? - September 26, 1844) or Aytech the Traitor, was a Circassian military commander, nobleman and double agent who took part in the Russo-Circassian War. He frequently changed sides and was a notable participant on both sides of the conflict. In the end, he was known as a traitor by both sides and did not have a funeral.

Biography

Early life 
Due to the rise of democratic factions in Circassia with the Circassian Revolution, and some regions abandoning social classes, he lost his status as a noble and initially supported the Russian invasion of Circassia to keep his noble titles. In 1828, he arrived at the Russian camp, where he took an oath of allegiance to the Russian Empire, changed his name to Aytek Konokov, converted to Christianity, took promise that his village would not be destroyed like the other Circassian villages, and accepted Russian citizenship.

After seeing the failure of Russian forces against the mountainous Circassians, he again switched sides, re-converted to Islam and started fighting for Circassia, but still declared that he is loyal to Russia. After it was realized that he switched sides, he officially switched sides and became a Circassian commander. As a result, in 1833, Russian general Grigory Zass, known for his hatred towards the Circassians, completely destroyed his village, killed most inhabitants, captured 68 prisoners and destroyed the stocks of hay and bread. After this, Qanoqo tried to defeat Zass, but failed. After this failure, he saw little hope left for Circassia and switched to the Russian side again.

Until 1844, Qanoqo served as a general in the Russian army and declared that he now had infinite loyalty. Later that year, seeing the Circassian resistance winning major battles against Russia, Qanoqo again switched sides, and joined Circassia against the Russian forces. On the night of August 26, he tried to siege the fortress of Grigory Zass, ultimately seeking revenge for his destroyed village, but failed. After this defeat, he reportedly sent a letter to the Ottoman sultan offering his loyalty but was ignored.

Death 
On September 26, 1844, he was killed by a Russian patrol near a Russian camp. Reportedly he was going to the Russian camp in order to switch sides again, but was executed by the Russians, who had no tolerance left of him. His body, contrary to tradition, was not removed by the Circassians from the battlefield for a funeral (janazah) and was left for the Russians to pick up; but the Russians did not take the body either.

References 

People of the Caucasian War
1844 deaths
Circassian military personnel of the Russo-Circassian War
Russian military personnel of the Caucasian War
Circassian nobility
Russian nobility
Converts to Christianity from Islam
Converts to Islam from Christianity
Converts to Eastern Orthodoxy from Islam
Converts to Islam from Eastern Orthodoxy